Xystus has several meanings:

 Xystus, a Greek architectural term denoting the covered portico of a gymnasium
 Xystus, another spelling for the Roman name Sixtus
 Pope Xystus I
 Pope Xystus II
 Pope Xystus III
 Xystus, a Greek student of Pythagoreanism with whom the authors of the Liber Pontificalis perhaps conflated with Xystus I
 Xystus (weevil), a beetle genus in the tribe Apostasimerini

See also:  Sixtus of Reims

da:Xystos
fr:Xyste
hu:Xystus